Henry Field (November 14, 1878 – October 23, 1944) was an American athlete. He competed in the men's standing long jump at the 1904 Summer Olympics.

References

External links

1878 births
1944 deaths
Athletes (track and field) at the 1904 Summer Olympics
American male long jumpers
Olympic track and field athletes of the United States
People from Saline County, Missouri
Farmers from Missouri